The discography of English singer-songwriter Simon Webbe consists of ten singles, three studio albums and one live album.

Studio albums

Live albums

Singles

As lead artist

As featured artist

References

Discographies of British artists
Pop music group discographies